Count Clary (born Justinien Charles Xavier Bretonneau; 20 April 1860 – 13 June 1933) was a French sport shooter who competed in the late 19th century and early 20th century in trap shooting. He participated in Shooting at the 1900 Summer Olympics in Paris and won the bronze medal in the trap competition. Fellow Frenchmen Roger de Barbarin and Rene Guyot won gold and silver respectively. He was born and died in Paris.

References

External links
 

1860 births
1933 deaths
French male sport shooters
Olympic bronze medalists for France
Olympic shooters of France
Shooters at the 1900 Summer Olympics
Sport shooters from Paris
Olympic medalists in shooting
Medalists at the 1900 Summer Olympics
International Olympic Committee members